El Tocuyo is a fertile valley and city in west-central Venezuela at  elevation. It is located in south-central Lara State about 60 km southwest of Barquisimeto.  The town of El Tocuyo was founded by Juan de Carvajal in 1545 on the banks of the Tocuyo River and it was the administrative capital of Venezuela Province from 1546 to 1548.  Its original name was Nuestra Señora de la Pura y Limpia Concepción del Tocuyo.  El Tocuyo is now just the municipal seat of Morán. Its population is 41,327 (2001).

The surrounding area has good soil and an ideal climate for agriculture, dry and warm with plenty of water available from the Tocuyo River.  The area has been occupied since prehistoric times. When the Spanish arrived they found the Gayones Indians, who inhabited this valley, sowing corn and other agricultural products as cotton and yucca. After the Spanish came, sugar cane was, for centuries, the biggest crop; but since 1980 vegetables such as tomatoes, onions, chiles, and potatoes are taking its place.

El Tocuyo Award
Formerly known as "Ruth Ocumárez Award" which being granted to those contestants in Miss Universe that was highly favored by the pageant fans to be in the semifinals but didn't made to be in the first cut.

Miss El Tocuyo titleholders

^

Notable people
Lisandro Alvarado (b. 1858 - d. 1929) - Doctor, Naturalist, Historian, Ethnologist and Linguist
Mariam Habach (b. 1996) - Miss Venezuela 2015 and Miss Universe 2016 contestant. Founder of EL TOCUYO AWARDS in 2016 
Zulmarys Sánchez (b. 1987) - Venezuelan olympic sprint canoer

References

External links

 "Historia de Venezuela para nosotros: El Tocuyo" Fundación Empresas Polar, in Spanish, title "History of Venezuela for us: El Tocuyo"
 https://web.archive.org/web/20160303220628/http://www.eltocuyo.8m.com/

Cities in Lara (state)
Populated places established in 1545
1545 establishments in the Spanish Empire